William Edward Robinson (December 15, 1920 – October 4, 2021) was an American Major League Baseball first baseman, scout, coach, and front office executive of the 1940s, 1950s, 1960s, 1970s, and 1980s who, during a 13-year playing career (1942; 1946–57), was on the roster of seven of the eight American League teams then in existence (with the Red Sox as the sole exception). He was the author of an autobiography, published in 2011, titled Lucky Me: My Sixty-five Years in Baseball.

Robinson was the last surviving member of the 1943 "Navy World Series", the last surviving member of a World Series-winning Cleveland Indians team, and the last surviving major leaguer to have played at League Park in Cleveland, which the Indians abandoned after the 1946 season. At the time of his death, he was the oldest living player from a World Series-winning team and the oldest living member of the Baltimore Orioles, Cleveland Indians, Chicago White Sox, Detroit Tigers, New York Yankees, Philadelphia / Kansas City Athletics, and Washington Senators. Following the death of Val Heim on November 21, 2019, Robinson became the oldest living former player.  Robinson was also the last living player from the 1942 season, as well as the oldest living player whose major league career was interrupted by World War II service.

Early life
Eddie Robinson was born and grew up in the Northeastern Texas town of Paris. He was the only child of William Edward Robinson, an automobile electrician born in Missouri, and Hazel Robinson, born in Tennessee. Eddie's father later left the family, and his parents divorced when Eddie was 12. He attended Paris Junior College.

Career
Eddie Robinson, a left-handed batter who threw right-handed, played four seasons in the minor leagues before being briefly called up at the end of the 1942 season by the Cleveland Indians. He enlisted in the U.S. Navy after the 1942 season and did not resume his baseball career until 1946. He suffered a leg injury while in the service, and never fully recovered fully thanks to a botched operation, but he recovered sufficiently to enjoy an outstanding major league career. He enjoyed his most prominent team moment when, at the age of 27, he contributed to his first team, the Cleveland Indians, winning the 1948 World Series.  Although traded during that offseason, he was still at the top of his game and with his next two teams, Washington Senators (1949–50) and Chicago White Sox (1950–52), experienced the most productive seasons of his time in the majors.  In 1951 Robinson began his life-long relationship with Paul Richards when former player Richards started his major league career as a manager with the Chicago White Sox.

Overall, he appeared in 1,315 games and batted .268 with 172 home runs, and 723 runs batted in. Defensively, he finished his career with a .990 fielding percentage playing every inning at first base. He did not play in the 1943 through 1945 seasons, due to his service in the U.S. Navy during World War II.

A four-time All-Star, he was the American League's starting first baseman for the midsummer classics of 1949 and 1952. The first game was a slugfest, 11–7, won by the American League, with a Robinson first-inning single off National league starter Warren Spahn driving in Joe DiMaggio. In the 1952 game, a rain-shortened 3-2 National League victory, Robinson singled in the American League's first run, scoring Minnie Miñoso, who had led off the fourth inning with a double.

On April 25, 1951 he became one of the few players to hit a home run out of old Comiskey Park.

In 1955, while playing for the New York Yankees as a part-time player, Robinson hit 16 home runs while having only 36 hits. He also had more runs batted in than hits, knocking in 42 runs. For the season he hit only .208 in 173 at bats, and had 36 base-on-balls.

Robinson was the oldest living Major League player who began his career during or after the 1940s, and he was the last living player whose Major League career was interrupted by World War II service. (Chris Haughey never made it back to the majors, and Eddie Basinski and Tommy Brown were civilians throughout the war.)

Post-playing career
Upon retirement, he became a coach for the Baltimore Orioles and then moved into their player development department. A protégé of Orioles manager and fellow Texan Paul Richards, he followed Richards to the Houston Astros, then worked as the farm system director of the Kansas City Athletics during the tempestuous ownership of Charlie Finley in the mid-1960s. In  he rejoined Richards in the front office of the Atlanta Braves. He succeeded Richards as general manager of the Braves during the 1972 season, serving through early 1976 in that post.

Robinson then returned to the American League as a member of the Texas Rangers front office. In 1977, Robinson was named co-general manager (with Dan O'Brien Sr.) of the Rangers, and became sole GM from 1978 to 1982. Although the Rangers posted winning seasons in 1977, 1978, and 1981, a disastrous 1982 campaign cost Robinson his job as General Manager.

Continuing in baseball as a scout and player development consultant, he found his last position as a scout for the Boston Red Sox, the only team of the "original eight" American League clubs that he did not play for.

The last living Cleveland Indians player to win a World Series championship (there are no living players who played on an earlier World Series championship team than Robinson's 1948 Indians), Robinson attended Game 6 of the 2016 World Series between the Indians and Chicago Cubs at Progressive Field in Cleveland. Robinson lived in Fort Worth, Texas. After the death of outfielder Val Heim, Robinson was recognized as the oldest living baseball player.

Personal life

Robinson enlisted in the U.S. Navy after the 1942 season; he served three years. After basic training, he married Elayne Elder in February 1943. They had two children, one of whom died in childhood, and divorced in 1951.

He married the former Bette Farlow, a native of Pittsburgh, Pennsylvania, in 1955. The couple raised three sons — Marc, Drew, and Paul. As of 1993 they had lived in Woodhaven Country Club Estates for 15 years and also grew and sold pecans from a farm near Austin, Texas.

He resided in Fort Worth, Texas, where he and Bette moved in 1984.

On December 15, 2020, Robinson turned 100. He was working on a podcast, "The Golden Age of Baseball", through which he hoped to eventually have donations made to the Alzheimer's Foundation.

Death
Eddie Robinson died on October 4, 2021, at his ranch in Bastrop, Texas. He was 100.

References

Further reading
New York Daily News: Meet two of the oldest living New York Yankees
News 5 Cleveland: Eddie Robinson of 1948 Cleveland Indians remembers World Series Tribe victory
[http://www.star-telegram.com/sports/mlb/article83126327.html Star-Telegram: Oldest-living Yankee *Eddie Robinson takes a New York bow
 Eddie Robinson: From the Loading Docks of Paris, Texas to the Big Show of Professional Baseball by Skipper Steely
 Lucky Me: My Sixty-Five Years in Baseball by Eddie Robinson and C. Paul Rogers.

External links

Baseball Almanac

1920 births
2021 deaths
American centenarians
American League All-Stars
Atlanta Braves executives
Baltimore Orioles coaches
Baltimore Orioles players
Baltimore Orioles executives
Baltimore Orioles (IL) players
Baseball players from Texas
Boston Red Sox scouts
Chicago White Sox players
Cleveland Indians players
Detroit Tigers players
Elmira Pioneers players
Houston Astros executives
Kansas City Athletics players
International League MVP award winners
Major League Baseball executives
Major League Baseball farm directors
Major League Baseball first basemen
Major League Baseball general managers
Men centenarians
Military personnel from Texas
Minnesota Twins scouts
New York Yankees players
Paris Dragons baseball players
People from Paris, Texas
Philadelphia Athletics players
Texas Rangers executives
United States Navy personnel of World War II
United States Navy sailors
Valdosta Trojans players
Washington Senators (1901–1960) players